Malibongwe Gcwabe (1969 – 13 May 2020) was a South African gospel singer and pastor of Remnant Ministries.

Career
Born in Worcester, Western Cape, South Africa, Gcwabe founded a singing group called "New Creation" with his siblings, before moving to East London, Eastern Cape, where he joined the Mdantsane-based Youth With Mission in the 1990s releasing six albums with them. He left the group in 2004 to forge a solo career releasing his first album Umlilo kaJesu under Amanxusa Big Fish Records. He released a further four records with them before starting his own record label Malibongwe Music Productions.

Personal life
Gcwabe met his first wife Ntomboxolo Mthombeni in 2001 and they had a daughter together; however they divorced in 2011. He then married his second wife Brenda and they had two children together before he died of a heart attack on 13 May 2020 in East London.

Partial discography
Siyakudumisa, 2009
The Other Side, 2010
Uthixo Omkhulu, 2011
Iyo Calvary, 2012
The Best Of Malibongwe, 2012
Akahluleki, 2014
Inzulu (20 years of god's favour), 2015
Yehova Ulungile, 2015 (with the Remnant Brothers)
''Ndakuva Ndiyaphendula, 2015All Is Well, 2015Isimemo, 2015Kuyabonelelwa, 2015Christmas with Mzansi men of Gospel, Vol.1., 2016Heritage Day Celebration Hits, 2016Kungegazi, 2016Ndiwabonile Amandla Akho (Educational Praise & Worship), 2017Urban Gospel Special'', 2017

References

1969 births
2020 deaths
South African gospel singers
People from Worcester, South Africa